A Wife and No Wife is a 1724 comedy play by the Irish writer Charles Coffey. It premiered at the Smock Alley Theatre in Dublin. The original cast included Richard Elrington and Thomas Hallam.

References

Bibliography
 Greene, John C. & Clark, Gladys L. H. The Dublin Stage, 1720-1745: A Calendar of Plays, Entertainments, and Afterpiece. Lehigh University Press, 1993.

1724 plays
Irish plays
Works by Charles Coffey
Comedy plays